European Champions Cup may refer to:
FIBA European Champions Cup, the former men's basketball club championship of Europe and officially recognized as predecessor to today's Euroleague
IIHF European Champions Cup, an annual ice hockey tournament, featuring the champions of national IIHF competitions
UEFA Champions League, formerly known as the European Cup, a football  club tournament
European Champions' Cup (bridge), an annual bridge tournament organised by the European Bridge League.
European Champion Clubs' Cup, the cup given to the winners of the UEFA Champions League
 European Rugby Champions Cup, an annual European rugby union tournament

See also 
European Cup (disambiguation)